The 105 mm MÁVAG 40/43M was a Hungarian howitzer used in World War II. It was designed and produced by MÁVAG for the Royal Hungarian Army.  It was a conservative design with horse traction, box trail and a muzzle brake.  It is estimated that only 72 were produced between 1940-1945 with the majority being used to arm the 43M Zrínyi assault gun.

References 

World War II howitzers
World War II field artillery
105 mm artillery
World War II military equipment of Hungary
Weapons of Hungary
Weapons and ammunition introduced in 1940